Hindley is a surname.

Surname
Charles Hindley (disambiguation), several people
Clement Hindley, British railway engineer
Henry Hindley, 18th-century clockmaker
J. Roger Hindley, of the Hindley–Milner type inference algorithm
Jai Hindley, Australian professional cyclist
Jeremy Hindley (1944–2013), English horse trainer
Matthew Hindley, South African artist
Myra Hindley (1942-2002), English serial killer
Peter Hindley (1944-2021), English footballer
Richard Hindley, English cricketer

Fictional characters
Hindley Earnshaw, fictional character in Emily Brontë's Wuthering Heights